Lilies is the third studio album by Belgium musician Melanie De Biasio. It was released on 6 October 2017 through PIAS Recordings.

Track listing

Charts

Weekly charts

Year-end charts

References

2017 albums
PIAS Recordings albums